The Government of the 28th Dáil or the 25th Government of Ireland (26 June 1997 – 6 June 2002) was the government of Ireland formed after the 1997 general election which had been held on 6 June 1997. It was a minority coalition government of Fianna Fáil and the Progressive Democrats, led by Fianna Fáil leader Bertie Ahern as Taoiseach.

The 25th Government lasted  days.

25th Government of Ireland

Nomination of Taoiseach
The members of the 28th Dáil first met on 26 June 1997. In the debate on the nomination of Taoisech, both outgoing Taoiseach and Fine Gael leader John Bruton and Fianna Fáil leader Bertie Ahern were proposed. The vote on Bruton was defeated with 75 votes in favour to 87 against, while the vote on Ahern was approved by 85 to 78. Ahern was then appointed as Taoiseach by President Mary Robinson.

Members of the Government
After his appointment by the president, Bertie Ahern proposed the members of the government and they were approved by the Dáil. They were appointed by the president on the same day.

Changes to Departments

Attorney General
David Byrne SC was appointed by the president as Attorney General on the nomination of the Taoiseach. In 1999, he resigned on his nomination as European Commissioner. On 17 July 1999, Michael McDowell SC was appointed by the president as Attorney General on the nomination of the Taoiseach.

Ministers of State
On 26 June 1997, the Government on the nomination of the Taoiseach appointed Séamus Brennan to the post of Minister for State at the Department of the Taoiseach with special responsibility as Government Chief Whip and Bobby Molloy to the position of Minister of State to the Government. On 1 July 1997, the Government on the nomination of the Taoiseach appointed Michael Smith and Liz O'Donnell. On 8 July 1997, the Government on the nomination of the Taoiseach appointed the other Ministers of State.

Confidence in the government
After evidence given by Ahern at the Moriarty Tribunal, a motion of no confidence was proposed in the government. This was then debated on 30 June 2000 as a motion of confidence in the government, proposed by the Taoiseach. It was approved by the Dáil.

Dissolution
On 25 April 2002, the president dissolved the Dáil on the advice of the Taoiseach, and a general election was held on 17 May. The members of the 29th Dáil met on 6 June and Bertie Ahern was re-appointed as Taoiseach and formed a new government.

See also
Constitution of Ireland
Politics of the Republic of Ireland

References

28th Dáil
1997 establishments in Ireland
2002 disestablishments in Ireland
Cabinets established in 1997
Cabinets disestablished in 2002
Coalition governments of Ireland
Governments of Ireland